The Town is a three-part British television drama series, created by playwright Mike Bartlett, that was first broadcast on ITV on 5 December 2012. The series, which stars Andrew Scott as Mark Nicholas, a young man who returns to his hometown of Renton following the death of both of his parents, was Bartlett's first project for television. The series also stars Martin Clunes as Len Robson, the mayor of Renton; Julia McKenzie as Mark's estranged grandmother, Betty; Avigail Tlalim as Jodie, Mark's rebellious 15-year-old sister; and Charlotte Riley as Alice, Mark's first love.

Filming locations for the series included the high street of High Wycombe, Buckinghamshire; Hughenden Park; The Rye; and High Wycombe railway station. The mayor's office was also located in a Chapel Lane building in High Wycombe. Scott said of his role in the series; "I was anxious to find a project where I could show a little more light and shade. I wouldn't describe my character [Mark] as an everyman; but he's certainly somebody people will recognise. Mark ticked those boxes post-Sherlock as a character, and The Town was a really exciting project for me." The series was released on DVD in Australia, New Zealand and Spain in 2013; but remains unreleased on DVD in the UK.

Cast
 Andrew Scott as Mark Nicholas; a young man who returns to his hometown of Renton following the death of both his parents in a reported suicide pact
 Martin Clunes as Len Robson; the Mayor of Renton who struggles with alcohol problems, exacerbated by the range of public relations problems he is involved with.
 Avigail Tlalim as Jodie Nicholas; Mark's rebellious 15-year-old sister. Jodie's relationship with her brother is strained at first, having never known her brother throughout her life.
 Julia McKenzie as Betty Nicholas; Mark's estranged grandmother, who has occupied his old childhood bedroom in his absence.
 Charlotte Riley as Alice; Mark's first love. Mark's return troubles Alice, who eventually leaves her husband to be with him.
 Douglas Hodge as Inspector Chris Franks; an officer from the local police force who had been having a long-term affair with Mark's mother Kate.
 Gerard Kearns as Daniel; an undertaker who is sacked after dropping Mark's mother's body. He later finds work as a cleaner alongside Betty.
 Callum Turner as Ashley; Jodie's bad boy boyfriend. A troubled teen and reckless boy racer, Ashley is much more complicated than he first appears.
 Goldy Notay as Shireen; the Deputy Mayor of Renton and assistant to Len Robson. She is serious and ambitious, and often struggles to deal with Len's erratic behaviour. 
 Sam Troughton as Jeff; an old friend of Mark's.
 Kelly Adams as Lucy; an old friend of Mark's.
 Aisling Bea as Carly; an old friend of Mark's.
 Toby Regbo as Harry; a scholarship pupil who was Jodie's boyfriend.
 Jon Foster as Karl; Alice's husband, with whom she has had a child, Sophie.

Episodes

References

External links

2012 British television series debuts
2012 British television series endings
ITV television dramas
Television series by Big Talk Productions
Television series by ITV Studios
English-language television shows